Francis Willughby's Book of Games is a book published in 2003 that printed for the first time a transcription of a seventeenth-century manuscript written by  Francis Willughby that was held in the library of the University of Nottingham. The manuscript was left incomplete when Willughby died at the age of 36, but even in its unfinished state it provides an unrivalled insight into the sports and games of his period.

Among the features of the book include descriptions of card games that are otherwise only known from reference in literature. It also includes the first formal study of children's board games to be written in a European language; investigation of the original manuscript has revealed that some of the descriptions of children's games were actually written by an unknown child, with later corrections being made by Willughby.

Card games 
There is a general introduction about card games and then the following are described in detail: 
 One and Thirtie (Thirty One)
 One and Thirtie Bon Ace
 Hannikin Canst Abide It, an English version of Quinze
 Laugh & Ly Downe
 Nodde, also spelt Noddy, a precursor to Cribbage
 Cribbidge (Cribbage) and variants called "A New Cribbidge or Nodde" and "Double Hand Cribbidge"
 Ruffe & Trump, a form of Ruff and Honours
 Gleeke, also spelt Gleek
 Beast, or Le Beste, English version of the French La Bête
 Loosing Lodum and a variant called Winning Loadum
 Ging or Seven Cards
 Put, an old English gambling game
 Wheehee, a children's game

Tables games 
There is a general introduction, "Tables", on the equipment used for tables games followed by detailed accounts of the following:
 Dublets
 Ticktack
 Irish, the immediate ancestor of Backgammon
 Back Gammon (Backgammon)
 Long Laurence, not a tables game but a gambling game with an elongated die

Footnotes

References

Bibliography 
 Forgeng, Jeff, Dorothy Johnston and David Cram (2003). Francis Willughby's Book of Games. Ashgate Press. .
 Willughby, Francis. A Volume of Plaies. (Manuscript in the Middleton collection, University of Nottingham, shelfmark Li 113.) c1665-70.
 Willughby, Francis, volume containing descriptions of games and pastimes ("Francis Willughby's Book of Games"), c.1660-1672. Manuscript in the Middleton collection, University of Nottingham; document reference Mi LM 14

Books about board games
2003 non-fiction books
Card game books
Ashgate Publishing books